The US Conference of Chaplains is a 501c3 organization made up of chaplains and chaplain assistants (clergy and laity) forming ministry teams in their local communities.  The motto "fidei et operibus" – is representative of the mission and vision of the USCoC – which in English is "by faith and works". Whether the focus of the individual ministry is corporate, prison, emergency services, nursing home, veterans, campus, hospital, fraternal, disaster preparedness, active military and reservists, sports, hospice or the streets – members keep their minds alert and their hearts tender to the opportunities to be of service which present themselves every day.

The conference is not affiliated with any branch of the armed services nor endorsed by the federal government.  They are managed by a board of directors with the collective goal of being the premier organization for Chaplain training.  The USCoC is also intended to serve as a covering for individual efforts which may want to include uniformed ministry.  Formed in 2011, they are headquartered in Phelan, California.

References

Guidestar Gold Seal of Transparency link to profile https://www.guidestar.org/profile/45-3478782

External links
 

Religious occupations
Ecclesiastical titles